is a 1978 Japanese film directed by Hideo Gosha. Based on the novel Kumokiri Nizaemon written by Shōtarō Ikenami.

Cast
Tatsuya Nakadai as Kumokiri Nizaemon
Shima Iwashita as Chiyo
Kōshirō Matsumoto as Shikubu Abe
Takashi Yamaguchi as Tsugutomo Owari
Isao Natsuyagi
Hiroyuki Nagato
Rinichi Yamamoto
Kunie Tanaka
Shingo Yamashiro
Tatsuo Umemiya
Takuzo Kawatani
Hideo Takamatsu as Yamada Tobei
Tappie Shimokawa as Jihei
Tetsurō Tamba as Kichibei
Keiko Matsuzaka as Shino
Junko Miyashita as Menbiki Okyo
Ryōhei Uchida as Yomohichi Chiaki
Mitsuko Baishō as Omatsu
Mikio Narita
Go Kato

Production
 Yoshinobu Nishioka - Art direction

Reception
Jason Buchanan at AllMovie says that director Hideo Gosha makes a "triumphant return to the samurai genre with this plot twisting, nerve shredding tale", but critic Alexander Jacoby calls it "a bland chanbara".

Awards and nominations
21st Blue Ribbon Awards
 Won: Best Supporting Actress - Junko Miyashita

Other adaptation
Kumokiri Nizaemon

References

External links

1978 films
Films directed by Hideo Gosha
1960s Japanese-language films
Shochiku films
Samurai films
Jidaigeki films
1970s Japanese films
1960s Japanese films